Guergana Petrova is an applied mathematician known for her research on numerical methods for solving differential equations. She is a professor of mathematics at Texas A&M University.

Education and career
Petrova earned bachelor's and master's degrees from Sofia University. She moved to the US for her doctoral studies, completing a Ph.D.  at the University of South Carolina.

She joined the University of Michigan mathematics department as a visiting assistant professor and then moved to Texas A&M. At Texas A&M, she is also affiliated with the Institute for Applied Mathematics and Computational Science.

References

External links
Home page

Year of birth missing (living people)
Living people
Bulgarian mathematicians
Bulgarian women mathematicians
21st-century American mathematicians
American women mathematicians
Sofia University alumni
University of Michigan faculty
Texas A&M University faculty
21st-century women mathematicians
21st-century American women